Richard Sylbert (April 16, 1928 – March 23, 2002) was an American production designer and art director, primarily for feature films.

Early life
Sylbert was born in Brooklyn, New York, to Samuel and Lily (Lazell) Sylbert, and was the twin brother of Oscar-winning production designer Paul Sylbert.  Richard fought in the Korean War and attended the Tyler School of Art at Temple University in Elkins Park, Pennsylvania. His grandfather, Ribac, was a journalist in his native Romania before immigrating to the United States. Sylbert began his career in the early days of television, designing productions of Hamlet (1953) and Richard II (1954) for the Hallmark Hall of Fame.

Sylbert's first film credit was Patterns (1956), a big screen adaptation of an Emmy Award-winning teleplay by Rod Serling. He went on to design Baby Doll, A Face in the Crowd, The Fugitive Kind, Murder, Inc., Splendor in the Grass, Walk on the Wild Side, Long Day's Journey into Night, The Manchurian Candidate, The Pawnbroker, Lilith, Who's Afraid of Virginia Woolf?, The Graduate, Rosemary's Baby, Catch-22, Carnal Knowledge, Chinatown, Shampoo, Reds, Frances, The Cotton Club, Tequila Sunrise, Dick Tracy, The Bonfire of the Vanities, Carlito's Way, Mulholland Falls, My Best Friend's Wedding, and Trapped. He worked multiple times with directors Roman Polanski, Elia Kazan, Mike Nichols, and Warren Beatty.

Robert Evans named Sylbert his successor when he relinquished his position as production chief at Paramount Pictures in 1975. Sylbert oversaw The Bad News Bears, Nashville, and Days of Heaven before being replaced in 1978.

Sylbert was nominated for the Academy Award for Best Art Direction six times and won twice, for Who's Afraid of Virginia Woolf? and Dick Tracy. He won the BAFTA Award for Best Production Design for Dick Tracy. He was nominated for an Emmy for his production design of the set for the long-running television sit-com Cheers. In 2000 Sylbert was honored with the Art Directors Guild Lifetime Achievement Award. In 2002 Sylbert was to have received the Hollywood Film Festival's Life Achievement Award.  His widow gave the committee permission to name the award after him in perpetuity and that year it was given to Harold Michelson, his longtime art director and colleague.

Sylbert died of cancer at the age of 73 at the Motion Picture & Television Country House and Hospital in Woodland Hills, California. At the time of his death, Sylbert was married to Native American poet Sharmagne Leland-St. John, mother of one of his daughters, Daisy Alexandra Sylbert-Torres, a costume designer and Echo Park boutique owner.  He had three sons Douglas, Jon and Mark, by his first wife, Carol Godshalk, and another daughter, Lulu, by writer/actress/production and costume Designer Susanna Moore. Lulu acted as a child, playing Paul Le Mat's half-alien daughter in Strange Invaders.

Film and television credits
This is the not-entirely complete table of credits that can be sorted by date, title or type of credit.

Bibliography

References

External links
 
 Richard Sylbert
 NY Times

Best Art Direction Academy Award winners
Best Production Design BAFTA Award winners
People from Brooklyn
American production designers
American art directors
American people of Romanian-Jewish descent
1928 births
2002 deaths
Deaths from cancer in California
American twins
Identical twins
Erasmus Hall High School alumni